A list of films produced in the Soviet Union in 1926 (see 1926 in film).

1926

See also
 1926 in the Soviet Union

External links
 Soviet films of 1926 at the Internet Movie Database

1926
Soviet
Films